Vegam is a 2014 Malayalam film starring Vineeth Kumar, Jacob Gregory, Samskruthy Shenoy, Prathap Pothen, and Shammi Thilakan in the lead roles. Vegam is a thriller film directed by K G Anil Kumar, and produced under the banner of FX4 Movie Makers. Govind Menon composed music for the film.

The film began filming in January 2014 in and around Cochin, with the final schedule completing in April 2014. The film was released on July 11, 2014 and carried mixed reports.

Plot summary

Vegam deals with the life of two youngsters played by Vineeth Kumar and Jacob Gregory who wants to make more money and lead a luxurious life. They decide to do whatever it takes to get to the life of their dreams, but end up getting into more and more trouble. By the time they realize the danger, it is too late to come out of it. Samskruthy Shenoy plays the love life of Vineeth Kumar. Prathap Pothen does the role of a Gulf returnee, leading a peaceful family life. Swapna Menon does the role of his daughter. Shammy Thilakan plays an interesting role in the film.

Cast 
 Vineeth Kumar as Sidharth
 Jacob Gregory as Daveed
 Samskruthy Shenoy as Meera
 Prathap Pothen as Benny
 Shammy Thilakan as Murukan
 Joju George as George
 Asha Aravind as Nancy
Sunil Sukhada as Paulose Achayan
Valsala Menon as Annamma
Jayaraj Warrier as Jhonsy
P. Balachandran as Vijayan
Baiju VK as Sunny
Swapna Menon as Nimmi
Nisha Sarong as Molly

Music

The Original Songs and Score Composed by Govind Menon

Release 
The Times of India gave the film a rating of three out of five stars and wrote that "It is hard to write off Vegam as a brainless repetition of clichés for it does engage the viewer. However, it does not happen with a gripping consistency". Sify gave the film a verdict of average and noted that "Vegam can be a watchable fare for those who haven?t seen films of this genre. For the rest of the world, it could be a rather ordinary outing at best. Now, decide on your own".

References

External links 
 
 Official Facebook Page
 FX4 Movie Makers at Facebook

2010s Malayalam-language films
2014 films
Films scored by Govind Vasantha